Gustavo Cipriano de Azevedo (born 26 February 2001) is a Brazilian footballer who plays as a central defender for Botafogo-SP.

Club career
Born in Santos, São Paulo, Cipriano joined Santos' youth setup at the age of five. On 9 May 2018, he signed his first professional contract, agreeing to a three-year deal until April 2021.

On 26 July 2019, Cipriano moved to Serie A side Lazio on loan for one year, with a buyout clause; he was initially assigned to the Primavera squad. He returned in July of the following year, and left Peixe on 30 April 2021, as his contract expired.

On 30 June 2021, Cipriano signed a contract with Série B side Ponte Preta until May 2022. He made his professional debut on 20 November, coming on as a late substitute for Yago in a 1–0 away win over Confiança.

Cipriano played a further match for Ponte before spending the entire 2022 campaign with the under-23 team. On 8 December of that year, he was announced at Botafogo-SP for the upcoming season.

Career statistics

References

2001 births
Living people
Sportspeople from Santos, São Paulo
Brazilian footballers
Association football defenders
Campeonato Brasileiro Série B players
Associação Atlética Ponte Preta players
Botafogo Futebol Clube (SP) players
Brazilian expatriate footballers
Brazilian expatriate sportspeople in Italy
Expatriate footballers in Italy